Olenecamptus tessellatus is a species of beetle in the family Cerambycidae. It was described by William Lucas Distant in 1898.

Variety
 Olenecamptus tessellatus var. battangi Villa, 1901
 Olenecamptus tessellatus var. vittatus Breuning, 1940

References

Dorcaschematini
Beetles described in 1898